This is a list of Italian films first released in 2016 (see 2016 in film).

External links
 Italian films of 2016 at the Internet Movie Database

2016
Films
Italian